Adam Kasia (also referred to using the portmanteau Adakas  or Adakas Ziwa in the Ginza Rabba) means "the hidden Adam" in Mandaic. The hidden Adam is also called Adam Qadmaiia ("The First Adam"). In Mandaeism, it means the soul of the first man.

Among the Mandaeans, Adam Kasia means the soul of every human. Adam Kasia shows many similarities with the Jewish idea of Adam Kadmon.

Prayers in the Qolasta, such as the Asiet Malkia, also refer to Adam as "Adam the First Man" (Adam Gabra Qadmaiia). The 1012 Questions, a Mandaean priestly text, also refers to Adam Kasia as Adam-S'haq ('Adam-was-bright'), Adam-S'haq-Ziwa, or Adam-S'haq-Rba, who is described as the father of Shishlam, the archetype of the prototypical Mandaean.

The wife of Adam Kasia is Hawa Kasia ('hidden Eve'), also known as Hawa Ziwa ('radiant Eve') or Anana Ziwa ('radiant cloud').

See also
 Adam and Eve
 Adam Kadmon in Judaism
 Adam Pagria (earthly Adam)
 Al-Insān al-Kāmil in Islam
 Cosmic Man
 Purusha in Hinduism
 Shishlam

References

Sources
 Ethel Stefana Drower: The Secret Adam: A Study of Naṣoraean Gnosis, Clarendon Press, 1960, p. 21
 Ethel Stefana Drower: The Mandaeans of Iraq and Iran: Their Cults, Customs, Magic Legends, and Folklore, Gorgias Press, p. 73, 
 Manfred Lurker: A Dictionary of Gods and Goddesses, Devils and Demons, Routledge & Kegan Paul Ltd, 1987, p. 6
 Gerhard J. Bellinger: Knaurs Lexikon der Mythologie. 3100 Stichwörter zu den Mythen aller Völker von den Anfängen bis zur Gegenwart. Droemer Knaur Verlag, München 1989, .
 Horst Robert Balz, Gerhard Krause, Gerhard Müller: Theologische Realenzyklopädie. Band 22. 1992.

Mandaic words and phrases
Religious concepts related with Adam and Eve
Mythological first humans
Mandaean philosophical concepts